Ingram Planetarium is a planetarium located at Sunset Beach in Brunswick County, North Carolina.  The Board of Trustees of the Ocean Isle Museum Foundation, Inc. is the governing body of Ingram Planetarium as well as the Museum of Coastal Carolina, located at Ocean Isle Beach, North Carolina.

References

Planetaria in the United States
Museums in Brunswick County, North Carolina
Museums established in 2002
Education in Brunswick County, North Carolina
Buildings and structures in Brunswick County, North Carolina
Science museums in North Carolina
2002 establishments in North Carolina